Ilgaz 15 July Independence Tunnel, shortly Ilgaz Tunnel, ( or Ilgaz Tüneli), is a highway tunnel  through the Ilgaz Mountains between Kastamonu Province and Çankırı Province in northern Turkey. The tunnel has twin tubes of 
 and 
 in length. The tunnel was opened to traffic on December 26, 2016.

The construction cost of the tunnel was budgeted to  572 million (approx. US$200 million as of March 2016). The foundation stone laying ceremony took place on November 9, 2012. Tunnel boring works were completed on April 3, 2016.

References

Road tunnels in Turkey
Transport in Kastamonu Province
Transport in Çankırı Province
Tunnels completed in 2016
2016 establishments in Turkey